Sukkari or sukkary is a cultivar of the palm date that is widely grown in Saudi Arabia. Its skin is light yellow or golden brown. Sukkari dates are soft and extremely sweet.

See also
List of date cultivars
Mazafati, a soft, sweet date cultivar from Iran

References

Date cultivars
Agriculture in Saudi Arabia